Haplochromis aelocephalus is a species of cichlid endemic to Lake Victoria, but has not been seen since 1985. It may be extinct, but is maintained as Critically Endangered by the IUCN in the small chance that a tiny –but currently unknown– population survives.  This species can reach a length of  SL.

References

aelocephalus
Fish described in 1959
Taxa named by Humphry Greenwood
Taxonomy articles created by Polbot